Ima Anatolevna Bohush (born 2 August 1990 in Minsk) is a retired Belarusian tennis player.

Bohush won four doubles titles on the ITF tour in her career. On 15 September 2008, she reached her best singles ranking of world number 515. On 21 September 2009, she peaked at world number 260 in the doubles rankings.

Playing for Belarus at the Fed Cup, Bohush had a win–loss record of 2–1.

ITF finals (4–5)

Doubles (4–5)

Fed Cup participation

Singles

Doubles

References

External links 
 
 
 

1990 births
Living people
Tennis players from Minsk
Belarusian female tennis players
21st-century Belarusian women